George A. Finola (5 October 1945 – 1 December 2000) was an American jazz cornetist.

Biography 
Finola played professionally in New Orleans, playing gigs and advancing jazz scholarships most of his life and was an attraction. He founded the Jazz Institute of Chicago and was among the organizers of the first New Orleans Jazz Festival in 1965. He released his debut album Jazz Of The Chosen Few in 1965, where he is paired with notable musicians like Paul Crawford, Raymond Burke, Armand Hug, Danny and Blue Lu Barker.

Discography (in selection) 
 1965: Jazz Of The Chosen Few (Continental Recording And Sound Productions - JM-65-4)
 1975: No Words, Just George (Meiersdorff Record Productions - MRP1)
 1976: New Orleans After Hours (Maison Bourbon - MB 4)

References

External links 
 JIM BRANSON RECALLS GEORGE FINOLA (Nov. 24, 2014) on YouTube

1945 births
2000 deaths
American jazz bandleaders
American jazz cornetists
Dixieland bandleaders
Dixieland singers
Dixieland cornetists
Jazz musicians from New Orleans
American male jazz musicians
Swing bandleaders
20th-century American male musicians